Yingzhou District  is a district of the city of Fuyang, Anhui Province, China.

Administrative divisions
In the present, Yingzhou District has 4 subdistricts, 7 towns and 1 township.
4 subdistricts
 Yingxi
 Gulou
 Qinghe
 Wenfeng

7 towns

1 townships
 Mazhai

References

Fuyang